Tony Glynn (1926–1994) was an Australian missionary priest in Japan whose work for postwar reconciliation between former enemies earned him imperial and national honours from both countries.

Early life 

Anthony Joachim "Tony" Glynn was born in Casino, northern New South Wales in 1926, one of eight children of Harold Marcus Glynn, a successful store owner, and Nina Rose Glynn née Dougherty. Following the death of his mother, when he was six, her younger sister Molly stepped in to help raise the children. His aunt's decision to sacrifice her career and her own marriage plans offered a model of selflessness that deeply influenced the boy. Tony was attending boarding school in Sydney at St Joseph's College, Hunters Hill when the British colony of Singapore fell to the Imperial Japanese Army in 1942. Because of widespread fear of a possible Japanese invasion of Australia, he and his younger brother Paul Glynn were called back to Lismore to finish their schooling at St John's College, Woodlawn.

Religious vocation 
The Glynns were a devout Roman Catholic family of Irish immigrant heritage. Three of the boys, John, Tony and Paul, would train for the priesthood at the Toongabbie (Sydney) seminary of the Society of Mary or Marist order. While studying at Toongabbie in 1946 Tony met Fr Lionel Marsden who while serving as a chaplain in the 8th Division Australian Imperial Force (AIF) had become a prisoner-of-war and been put to work on the notorious Thai-Burma Railway. Marsden later experienced a spiritual crisis in revulsion at his feelings of hatred for his former captors and decided to establish a mission in Japan with the aim of healing the wounds of war and promoting reconciliation. The newly-ordained Fr Tony Glynn was accepted for the Japanese mission in January 1952.

Nara 
After arriving at the Marist headquarters in Kyoto, Tony went to work studying the Japanese language. His early pastoral duties included ministering to the sick at a leprosarium near Tokyo. The Allied military Occupation of Japan had just ended, and the defeated country showed many signs of the ravages of war. In 1953 Tony was appointed to a parish in the city of Nara. He visited the sick and prisoners in jail, taught Bible studies, ran youth groups and organised aid deliveries from abroad. During his career he delivered more than 150,000 items, such as winter clothing, to the poor. In this last endeavour he was assisted by his brother and fellow Marist priest, Fr John Glynn, who edited a magazine, The Harvest, that publicised the order's overseas missions. Tony also made a point of forging close ties with members of the Buddhist and Shinto faiths and he would lead seven pioneering Buddhist/Christian prayer pilgrimages to Pacific War sites, from Lae, in Papua New Guinea, to Nagasaki.

Marlon Brando and Glenn Ford 
One night in May 1956 Father Glynn took a telephone call at the Nara presbytery. On the other end of the line was the American actor Glenn Ford who was in Japan filming The Teahouse of the August Moon. Another member of the cast, Louis Calhern, had suffered a heart attack and died, explained Ford, could the priest come immediately? The next day Ford and fellow actor Marlon Brando arrived at the church to arrange Calhern's funeral. Ever eager to promote Japanese-American friendship, Tony alerted the press to the story. As Tony's brother, Fr Paul Glynn, writes: "After the obsequies, Glenn Ford joined Tony and his 45 boy scouts and American children from the US Marine Camp in a suki-yaki party."

Breaking down prejudice 

Father Glynn was posted back to Australia temporarily in 1957. When news circulated of his impending departure he was showered with gifts by parishioners, community organisations and local dignitaries grateful for his services to the people of Nara. This gave Tony the idea of making a public exhibition of the gifts, which included many valuable works of art. Back in Sydney he approached several potential venues, but none would accept the proposal. One store executive commented that ill-feeling towards the Japanese was so great "we couldn't guarantee safety". The Glynns appealed to Prime Minister Robert Menzies for help. Menzies personally arranged for Mark Foy's department store to provide space and took time out to open the exhibition in August 1958. Tony toured the cultural display to more than 40 cities and towns in Australia and New Zealand.

Japanese swords 
The publicity generated by the exhibition gave the priest an opportunity to spread the message of reconciliation. Some war veterans remained hostile, but others responded by coming forward with traditional Japanese swords they had picked up on battlefields in the Pacific or confiscated from surrendering Japanese soldiers. Father Glynn undertook to return them to the families of their owners in Japan and for this purpose collected around 80 swords during his lifetime.

Mixed-race children 
On his return to Japan in 1959 Tony Glynn took up the cause of mixed-race children who had been left behind in the city of Kure where the British Commonwealth Occupation Force was based between 1946 and 1952. A welfare agency identified around 100 children—many fathered by Australian servicemen—who were in desperate need due to poverty and social prejudice. The priest thought they should be allowed into Australia to be adopted, but government officials refused to grant an exception to the White Australia policy. Tony campaigned to raise money to provide living allowances and pay for the education of the children in Japan.

Honours 
For the last 26 years of his life, Father Glynn was pastor of Tomigaoka, a new suburb on the outskirts of Nara. He raised more than US$1 million to build a new church, convent and kindergarten and in the process won many admirers from both high and low of society. He drew hundreds, if not thousands, of Japanese to the Catholic faith—in a country where Christians make up less than 1% of the population. In the 1964 New Years' Honours List he was named a Member of the Order of the British Empire (MBE). He was made a Member of the Order of Australia (AO) in 1982 and also received the Order of the Rising Sun from the Japanese Emperor in 1985.

Death 

In 1982 Father Glynn was first diagnosed with cancer, leading to a series of operations over the following decade. Concerned that if he went back to Australia for treatment he would never be able to return to Japan, he resolved to keep working in his parish at Tomigaoka until the end. In the last weeks of his life he was made an honorary citizen of Nara. He died on 1 December 1994. An estimated 5,000 mourners attended the wake and funeral mass.

Tributes 
John Menadue, a former Ambassador to Japan, commented: "In his very direct way, Tony focused on the power of symbols and used them more effectively than any other person. He was the first to see a means to meet the need for reconciliation and forgiveness after the bitter war years and he became the heart and soul of it". Another friend, the author Morris West, said: "He believed what he taught [as a Marist missionary] and taught by his own example the essential message of the Gospel: reconciliation and love". Fr Paul Glynn, who has likewise been honoured for his achievements as a missionary and author, recalled: "Tony told me there is no cheap grace. We must struggle and sometimes suffer if we and others are to experience Christ's grace in ourselves and in those for whom we are responsible."

Legacy 

Tony Glynn has been the subject of two biographies: Shimpu-san: Healer of Hate by Jim Brigginshaw (1996) and "Like a Samurai": The Tony Glynn Story by Paul Glynn (2008). He was featured in a Japanese film documentary The Railroad of Love (1999) made by director Shigeki Chiba. His name was given to the Tony Glynn Australia-Japan Centre at the Lismore campus of Southern Cross University, which was dedicated in 2004. His image is preserved in a bronze plaque erected at Cowra, a city in country New South Wales that maintains close relations with Japan.

References 

1926 births
1994 deaths
Australian Roman Catholic missionaries
20th-century Australian Roman Catholic priests
Roman Catholic missionaries in Japan
Australian expatriates in Japan